West York Island, also known as Likas Island (Mandarin), and several other names.

The island is administered by the Philippines as part of Kalayaan, Palawan; it is located 47 miles (76 km) northeast of Pagasa Island (Thitu Island), the location of the Philippine defined major town of Kalayaan. Filipino soldiers are stationed on the island.

The island is also claimed by the People's Republic of China, the Republic of China (Taiwan) and Vietnam.

Structures and environment
West York Island is covered with low vegetation and scrub. Outcrops are visible on the southern and eastern portion of the island during low tides. It is a sanctuary for giant sea turtles that lay their eggs on the island all year round. The high salinity of the groundwater on the island retards the growth of introduced trees like coconuts, ipil-ipil, and other types; only those plants indigenous to the area, (mostly beach types of plants), thrive and survive the hot and humid condition, especially during the dry season.

There are no buildings on the island, except for the ruins of houses built by Japanese soldiers during World War II, and a small Philippine observation post where Filipino soldiers are stationed.

The Philippine Coast Guard constructed 5 lighthouses in the area, and this includes one on West York Island.

Plans
Kalayaan municipal officials have proposed that this island be populated with civilian settlers "within the coming years". If accomplished, it will be the second barangay of Kalayaan (after Thitu Island/Pag-asa). However, only naval vessels are currently capable of reaching the island. An estimate of 300 million pesos (US$7.5M) will be needed to construct an airstrip, a docking site, some land reclamation and other structures necessary to support an isolated community.

See also
Spratly Islands
Kalayaan, Palawan
List of maritime features in the Spratly Islands
Policies, activities and history of the Philippines in Spratly Islands

References

External links
Maritime Transparency Initiative Island Tracker

Islands of the Spratly Islands
Kalayaan, Palawan